Angelina Zhuk-Krasnova (born 7 February 1991) is a Russian athlete specialising in the pole vault. She finished seventh at the 2013 World Championships. She is also the 2013 European U23 Champion.

She has personal bests of 4.70 metres outdoors set in 2013 and 4.67 metres indoors set in 2015. She will represent Moldova at international competitions.

International competitions

References

1991 births
Living people
Russian female pole vaulters
World Athletics Championships athletes for Russia
European Athletics Championships medalists
Russian Athletics Championships winners